The Australian New Guinea Administrative Unit (ANGAU) was a civil administration of Territory of Papua and the Mandated Territory of New Guinea formed on 21 March 1942 during World War II.  The civil administration of both Papua and the Mandated Territory of New Guinea were replaced by an Australian Army military government and came under the control of ANGAU from February 1942 until the end of World War II.

Civil officers from both Papua and the Mandated Territory of New Guinea were posted to ANGAU based in Port Moresby. ANGAU undertook civil tasks of maintaining law and medical services in areas not occupied by the Imperial Japanese and was responsible to New Guinea Force.  The major responsibility of the unit was to organize the resources of land and labour for the war effort. ANGAU was also responsible for recruiting, organising and supervising local labour for the Australian and American armed forces in New Guinea included rehabilitation of the local inhabitants in reoccupied areas. It was also responsible for the administration of the Pacific Islands Regiment.

The ANGAU officers and their New Guinean carriers, labourers, scouts, guides and police were highly regarded by the American and Australian military. After the end of World War II, ANGAU was abolished and was replaced under the Papua New Guinea Provisional Administration Act (1945–46) by the combined government of Papua and Australian New Guinea.

Further reading

External links

Australian New Guinea Administrative Unit
Territorial Administrations
 The Royal Papua and New Guinea Constabulary: A Pictorial History Web Page 1885-1975

Australia–Papua New Guinea relations
History of Papua New Guinea
Government of Papua New Guinea
Territory of Papua
Territory of New Guinea
Papua New Guinea in World War II
Military units and formations established in 1942
Military units and formations disestablished in 1946
1942 in Papua New Guinea
1948 in Papua New Guinea